Manresa Island is a former island located in Norwalk, Connecticut, at the mouth of Norwalk Harbor in the Long Island Sound. The earliest name for the landform was Boutons Island, which dates to 1664. By the 19th century, the island had been purchased by John H. Keyser, who lived there and cultivated rare vegetation. He built a causeway in 1860, connecting the island to the mainland of South Norwalk. This gave rise to the name Keyser Island, which was sold to the Jesuits toward the end of the century.

On the island, the Jesuits established the Manresa Institute, which was the only dedicated retreat center in the United States. It hosted both prominent Catholic prelates as well as laymen, as part of a growing lay retreat movement in the United States. The institute was named for the Spanish town of Manresa, in which Saint Ignatius of Loyola, the founder of the Society of Jesus, wrote his Spiritual Exercises. In 1911, the Jesuits sold Keyser Island, which became known as Manresa Island in the mid-twentieth century.

In the 1950s, Connecticut Light & Power constructed a coal-fired power plant on the land. In 1972, the plant was converted to burn fuel oil, and an oil spill occurred, damaging the surrounding environment. The plant was sold to NRG Energy in 1999, and was severely damaged by Hurricane Sandy in 2012, leading to its permanent closure in 2013. A portion of the land today is an undeveloped and ecologically important marine habitat.

History 
The earliest records of the island date to 1664, when it was known as Boutons Island. Located in the Long Island Sound, at the mouth of Norwalk Harbor, the island is part of the city of Norwalk, Connecticut. It is situated across the harbor from the historic Calf Pasture Beach.

The island was owned by John H. Keyser, who lived on the island, giving rise to its later name of Keyser Island. In 1860, he spent thousands of dollars to build a causeway across the marsh to connect it to the mainland, allowing carriages to cross from South Norwalk. He developed the island as a park, filling it with rare trees and vegetation, and building a greenhouse. Keyser eventually sold the island to the Society of Jesus, in 1888 or 1889.

Manresa Institute 

With growing interest in religious retreats for laymen around the turn of the 19th century, the provincial superior of the Maryland-New York Province of the Society of Jesus, Joseph Hanselman, charged Fr. Terence Shealy with establishing a center to host retreats. The retreats would be designed for a wide range of workers, from bricklayers to bankers, and regardless of ability to pay. Shealy began hosting retreats at Fordham University, where he was an instructor at the School of Law, during the summers. Since retreats could only occur at Fordham when classes were not in session, a more secluded and permanent location was sought. Keyser Island was selected as a place that offered greater quietude for reflection. Eventually, retreats were permanently moved from Fordham to Keyser Island.

The Jesuits formally inaugurated the Manresa Institute on Keyser Island on April 21, 1889 (Easter Sunday), as the only facility in the United States dedicated solely to hosting retreats. The institute was named after the Spanish town of Manresa, where Saint Ignatius of Loyola, the 16th-century founder of the Society of Jesus, wrote the Spiritual Exercises. At the time the retreat center was founded, the urban area of South Norwalk was two miles away, and the area was very secluded. Besides the Jesuits who administered retreats, the  island was uninhabited. The Jesuits constructed one primary building, called Manresa House, from which the retreats were run, as well as two smaller cottages.

The center became a prominent retreat institution, where the newly appointed Bishops of Brooklyn, Albany, Ogdensburg, and Hartford went in preparation for their ordination as bishops. In 1911, Shealy decided to move the Manresa Institute to Staten Island in New York City, where he purchased the Fox Hill Villa near Fort Wadsworth. The retreat center continued to operate on Staten Island as Mount Manresa, until 1927. Keyser Island continued to be known by that name, until around the Second World War, when its name officially became Manresa Island.

Power plant 

The Jesuits eventually sold the land, and in 1953, the Norwalk Zoning Commission approved the construction of a coal-fired power plant by Connecticut Light & Power on the island. Despite opposition by local residents, the plant was built and put into service in 1960. A major spill of fuel oil occurred in 1969, causing significant ecological damage to the beach at Village Creek and the surrounding tidal flats. That same year, the plant built a transmission line beneath the Long Island Sound, connecting it to Long Island. By 1972, the plant had been converted to use oil instead of coal. In response to the Resource Conservation and Recovery Act, the first official recognition of the ecological damage done to the surrounding area by the plant was made in 1980. By the late 1990s, the island and plant had been recognized as heavily polluted.

In 1999, the power plant was purchased by NRG Energy, which continued to operate the facility. When Hurricane Sandy struck in 2012, almost the entire island was flooded. As a result of the damage, the plant was shut down in June 2013.

Physical growth of the island 
While the original Keyser Island was only , the island underwent significant expansion over the years, with the most dramatic growth occurring in the decades following the construction of the power plant. The first fill deposited was likely earth excavated during construction of the power plant and from dredging nearby. The significant land fill resulted in the differentiation of two parcels. The northern parcel is undeveloped land, and was created when Connecticut Light & Power received permission to deposit large quantities of coal ash there, which was a byproduct of the power plant's operation. The southern parcel, which contains the original, much smaller island, houses the decommissioned power plant and support infrastructure, as well as an electrical substation.

Redevelopment plans 
With the closing of the power plant in 2013, discussions between the state, local communities, and the plant owner have been underway on whether and how to decommission the facility and how to utilize Manresa Island generally, including how to remediate the significant ground pollutants at the site. In 2017, the Manresa Association and the City of Norwalk began a study to identify potential future uses of the land as well as the economic impact of those uses. The study was completed in 2019 and recommended four potential options for redevelopment of the southern parcel of the land: a marina, a solar farm, an educational facility, or a residential development. Each of these options would incur cleanup costs of $8 million to $30 million or more.

The Connecticut Department of Transportation announced in 2020 that it was considering using Manresa Island as a construction staging area for the project to replace the Norwalk River Railroad Bridge.

Biodiversity 
The undeveloped portion of Manresa Island, which consists of a coastal forest as well as intertidal estuaries, is one of the last remaining undisturbed marine habitats on the Fairfield County coast. It also contains a number of ecologically important wetlands. These habitats serve as breeding grounds for migratory birds, and are home to around 200 bird species. The waters around Manresa Island are designated as essential habitats for a number of fish species.

See also 

 Norwalk Islands
 Coastal Connecticut
 List of Jesuit sites

References

Citations

Sources

External links 

Manresa Association

Islands of Connecticut
Long Island Sound
Geography of Norwalk, Connecticut
Former islands of the United States
Ignatian spirituality
Former coal-fired power stations in the United States
Former oil-fired power stations in the United States
Former power stations in Connecticut